Scrobipalpula diffluella, the Essex groundling, is a moth of the family Gelechiidae. It is found in northern Europe (from Norway to Latvia and Finland), and central Europe (the Alps). There are scattered records from Great Britain and the Balkan Peninsula.

The wingspan is 11–12 mm.

The larvae feed on Aster alpinus, Aster amellus, Aster bellidiastrum, Erigeron acer (including subspecies politus), Erigeron uniflorus and Homogyne alpina. They mine the leaves of their host plant. The mine starts as a linear corridor, but becomes a blotch later. Pupation takes place outside of the mine. Larvae can be found in June. They are light green with a light brown head.

References

Moths described in 1870
Scrobipalpula
Moths of Europe